Luoshan Road is a Shanghai Metro interchange station which serves both Line 11 and Line 16. Line 11 opened on 31 August 2013, with the first section of Line 16 opening on 29 December 2013. It was formerly Line 16's northern terminus before its extension towards . It was also Line 11's eastern terminus before the extension to Kangxin Highway opened on 19 December 2015.

Station Layout

References

Railway stations in Shanghai
Line 11, Shanghai Metro
Shanghai Metro stations in Pudong
Railway stations in China opened in 2013